Vitrac may refer to the following places in France:

 Vitrac, Cantal, a commune of the Cantal département
 Vitrac, Dordogne, a commune of the Dordogne département
 Vitrac, Puy-de-Dôme, a commune of the Puy-de-Dôme département

Vitrac in Art:

 Roger Vitrac, a French Surrealist playwright and poet